The year 2006 is the 14th year in the history of the Ultimate Fighting Championship (UFC), a mixed martial arts promotion based in the United States. In 2006 the UFC held 18 events beginning with, UFC Fight Night 3.

Title fights

The Ultimate Fighter

Debut UFC fighters

The following fighters fought their first UFC fight in 2006:

 Alan Belcher
 Anderson Silva
 Anthony Perosh
 Anthony Torres
 Antoni Hardonk
 Assuerio Silva
 Carmelo Marrero
 Cheick Kongo
 Chris Price
 Christian Wellisch
 Clay Guida
 Cory Walmsley
 Dan Christison
 Dan Lauzon
 Danny Abbadi
 David Heath
 David Lee
 Dean Lister
 Derrick Noble
 Dokonjonosuke Mishima
 Drew McFedries
 Dustin Hazelett
 Ed Herman
 Eddie Sanchez
 Eric Schafer
 Forrest Petz
 Gabe Ruediger
 Gilbert Aldana

 Gleison Tibau
 Icho Larenas
 Jake O'Brien
 Jamie Varner
 Jason Dent
 Jason Lambert
 Jason MacDonald
 Jason Von Flue
 Jeff Joslin
 Jesse Forbes
 Joe Jordan
 Joe Lauzon
 Jorge Gurgel
 Jorge Santiago
 Josh Haynes
 Josh Schockman
 Junior Assuncao
 Justin James
 Justin Levens
 Kalib Starnes
 Keita Nakamura
 Kendall Grove
 Kris Rotharmel
 Kristof Midoux
 Kuniyoshi Hironaka
 Kurt Pellegrino
 Logan Clark
 Luigi Fioravanti

 Mario Neto
 Mark Hominick
 Martin Kampmann
 Matt Hamill
 Matt Wiman
 Michael Bisping
 Mike Nickels
 Mike Whitehead
 Pat Healy
 Rick Davis
 Rob MacDonald
 Roger Huerta
 Rory Singer
 Ross Pointon
 Sam Stout
 Scott Smith
 Seth Petruzelli
 Sherman Pendergarst
 Solomon Hutcherson
 Thales Leites
 Tom Murphy
 Tyson Griffin
 Victor Valimaki
 Wes Combs
 Wilson Gouveia
 Yuki Sasaki
 Yushin Okami

Events list

See also
 UFC
 List of UFC champions
 List of UFC events

References

Ultimate Fighting Championship by year
2006 in mixed martial arts